Caño Negro is a district of the Los Chiles canton, in the Alajuela province of Costa Rica.

Geography 
Caño Negro has an area of  km2 and an elevation of  metres.

Demographics 

For the 2011 census, Caño Negro had a population of  inhabitants.

Transportation

Road transportation 
The district is covered by the following road routes:
 National Route 138
 National Route 139

References 

Districts of Alajuela Province
Populated places in Alajuela Province